Talvin Hester (born July 16, 1978) is an American basketball coach who is the current head coach of the Louisiana Tech Bulldogs men's basketball team.

Playing career
Hester played a single season of college basketball at Dallas Christian College.

Coaching career
In 2002, Hester began his coaching career at North Lake College as an assistant coach, while also serving on the staff of the Texas Rim Rockers of the USBL. He'd move on to serve as an assistant coach at Texas Wesleyan, where he'd earn his degree, and a year later, would join the coaching staff at Texas College. Hester would get his start in the Division I ranks at Prairie View A&M on the staffs of both Darrell Hawkins and Byron Rimm II from 2005 to 2010, before moving on to San Jose State as an assistant. After two seasons with the Spartans, Hester would return to Texas and have two single-season stops at both Stephen F. Austin and Texas State before joining Kelvin Sampson's initial coaching staff at Houston. 

In 2017, Hester would spend a season on staff at Oral Roberts before joining Louisiana Tech as an assistant with Eric Konkol. He was on the Bulldogs' staff for its third place squad in the 2021 NIT. For the 2021–22 season, Hester was on staff at Texas Tech under Mark Adams, which reached the Sweet 16 in the 2022 NCAA tournament.

When Konkol left to take the head coaching position at Tulsa, Hester returned to Louisiana Tech as the 19th coach in program history.

Head coaching record

References

Living people
1978 births
American men's basketball coaches
Louisiana Tech Bulldogs basketball coaches
Texas Tech Red Raiders basketball coaches
Oral Roberts Golden Eagles men's basketball coaches
Houston Cougars men's basketball coaches
Texas State Bobcats men's basketball coaches
Stephen F. Austin Lumberjacks basketball coaches
San Jose State Spartans men's basketball coaches
Prairie View A&M Panthers basketball coaches
Texas Wesleyan Rams men's basketball coaches
Texas Wesleyan University alumni